New Aswan is a city in the Aswan Governorate, Egypt.

See also

 List of cities and towns in Egypt

References

Populated places in Aswan Governorate
1999 establishments in Egypt
Populated places established in 1999
Cities in Egypt
New towns in Egypt